Hannah Johnston Bailey (July 5, 1839 – October 23, 1923) was an American Quaker teacher, activist, and advocate for peace, temperance, and women's suffrage.

Early life
Hannah Clark Johnston was born in Cornwall, New York, in the Hudson Valley, the daughter of David Johnston and Letitia Clark Johnston. Her parents were Quakers; her father was a tanner and a farmer. She was the eldest of eleven children. Although they were Quakers, two of her younger brothers fought in the American Civil War, and one died, cementing for Hannah Johnston a commitment to peace.

Career
Bailey taught school in Plattekill, New York from 1858-67. She ran her late husband's businesses, a factory producing oilcloth and a carpet store, from 1882 until 1889, and 1891, respectively.

In 1883, she joined the Women's Christian Temperance Union (WCTU), and worked with Lillian M. N. Stevens to establish a reformatory for women in Maine. She represented Maine at the National Conference of Charities and Correction. In 1887, she became head of the WCTU's new Department of Peace and Arbitration, and through the organization worked to oppose war and violence in all forms, including capital punishment, lynching, prizefighting, military conscription, even toy soldiers and military drills in schools. In 1898 she was elected president of the Woman's Temperance Publishing Association, succeeding Matilda Carse.

She was editor and publisher of two WCTU peace periodicals, Pacific Banner and Acorn (intended for young readers), from her home in Winthrop, Maine. She retired from her WCTU posts in 1916, as World War I began and the WCTU endorsed American involvement.

From 1891 to 1897, she was president of the Maine Woman Suffrage Association, and from 1895 to 1899 she served as treasurer of the National Council of Women. In 1915 she joined the Woman's Peace Party, and was a member of the Women's International League for Peace and Freedom at the end of her life.

Bailey wrote a biography of her late husband, Reminiscences of a Christian Life (1885).

Personal life
Hannah Clark Johnson married Moses Bailey in 1868, as his second wife. They had one child, Moses Melvin Bailey, born in 1869. She was widowed when her husband died in 1882, after a long illness. She died in Portland, Maine in 1923, aged 84. Her papers are archived in the Swarthmore College Peace Collection.

Selected works
 Reminiscences of a Christian Life (1885)

References

External links
 
 Much of the periodicals edited by Hannah J. Bailey have been digitized and are available at the In Her Own Right project

1839 births
1923 deaths
19th-century American non-fiction writers
19th-century American women writers
American pacifists
American Quakers
American suffragists
American temperance activists
American women biographers
American women non-fiction writers
Non-interventionism
Wikipedia articles incorporating text from A Woman of the Century